Stipe a Croatian masculine given name. It is cognate to Stephen, and found in areas where people speak Ikavian.

Notable people with the name include:

 Stipe Bačelić-Grgić (1988–), Croatian footballer
 Stipe Balajić (1968–), Croatian footballer
 Stipe Božić (1951–), Croatian alpinist
 Stipe Drews (born Drivić; 1973–), Croatian boxer
 Stipe Erceg (1974–), German-Croatian actor
 Stipe Lapić (1983–), Croatian footballer
 Stipe Matić (1979–), Croatian footballer
 Stipe Miocic (1982–), Croatian-American mixed martial artist; also paramedic and firefighter
 Stipe Modrić (1979–), Croatian-Slovenian basketballer and coach
 Stipe Pletikosa (1979–), Croatian footballer
 Stipe Šuvar (1936–2004), Croatian politician

See also
 Stipan
 Stjepan
 Stipić

Croatian masculine given names